Tessellota pura is a moth in the family Erebidae. It was first described by A. Breyer in 1957. It is found in Argentina and Bolivia.

References

Natural History Museum Lepidoptera generic names catalog

Moths described in 1957
Phaegopterina